A sawshark or saw shark is a member of a shark order (Pristiophoriformes ) bearing a unique long, saw-like rostrum (snout or bill) edged with sharp teeth, which they use to slash and disable their prey. There are eight species within the Pristiophoriformes, including the longnose or common sawshark (Pristiophorus cirratus), shortnose sawshark (Pristiophorus nudipinnis), Japanese sawshark (Pristiophorus japonicas), Bahamas sawshark (Pristiophorus schroederi), sixgill sawshark (Pliotrema warreni), African dwarf sawshark (Pristiophorus nancyae), Lana's sawshark (Pristiophorus lanae) and the tropical sawshark (Pristiophorus delicatus).

Sawsharks are found in many areas around the world, most commonly in waters from the Indian Ocean to the southern Pacific Ocean. They are normally found at depths around 40–100 m, but can be found much lower in tropical regions. The Bahamas sawshark was discovered in deeper waters (640 m to 915 m) of the northwestern Caribbean.

Description and life cycle

Sawsharks have a pair of long barbels about halfway along the snout. They have two dorsal fins, but lack anal fins. Genus Pliotrema has six gill slits, and Pristiophorus the more usual five. The teeth of the saw typically alternate between large and small. Saw sharks reach a length of up to 5 feet and a weight now of 18.7 pounds with females tending to be slightly larger than males.

The body of a longnose saw shark is covered in tiny placoid scales: modified teeth covered in hard enamel. The body is a yellow-brown color which is sometimes covered in dark spots or blotches. This coloration allows the saw shark to easily blend with the sandy ocean floor.

These sharks typically feed on small fish, squid, and crustaceans, depending on species. The function of the sawshark barbels are not well understood, and neither is how they use their rostrum.  It is possible they use it in a similar fashion as sawfishes, and hit prey with side-to-side swipes of the saw, crippling them. The saw could also be utilized against other predators in defense. The saw is covered with specialized sensory organs (ampullae of Lorenzini) which detect an electric field which is given off by buried prey.

Saw sharks life history is still poorly understood. Mating season occurs seasonally in coastal areas. Saw sharks are ovoviviparous meaning eggs hatch inside the mother. They have litters of 3–22 pups every 2 years. After 12 months of pregnancy, the pups are born at 30 cm long. While in the mother, pups' rostral teeth are angled backwards to avoid harming the mother. The life expectancy of sawsharks is still poorly understood, but they are thought to live to 10 years or more.

Human interaction 
Among the different species of sawshark, all are listed on the IUCN Red List of 2017 as either data deficient or of least concern Saw sharks do not see much human interaction because of their deep habitats.

Species 

There are currently ten known species of sawsharks across two genera in this family:
Pliotrema annae (Anna's sixgill sawshark)
Pliotrema kajae (Kaja's sixgill sawshark)
Pliotrema warreni (Warren's sixgill sawshark)
Pristiophorus cirratus (longnose sawshark or common sawshark)
Pristiophorus delicatus (tropical sawshark)
Pristiophorus japonicus (Japanese sawshark)
Pristiophorus lanae (Lana's sawshark)
Pristiophorus nancyae (African dwarf sawshark)
Pristiophorus nudipinnis (shortnose or southern sawshark)
Pristiophorus schroederi (Bahamas sawshark)

Sixgill sawshark 
The sixgill sawshark (Pliotrema warreni) is known for its six pairs of gills located on its sides close to the head. They are pale brown in color, with a white underbelly. Along with their color, their size sets them apart from the other types of sawfish: The females are around 136 cm where the males are around 112 cm. Sixgill sawsharks feed on shrimp, squid and bony fish. They are located around the southern portion of South Africa, and Madagascar. Where found, they are considered a prize catch. They dwell in the rage of 37–500 m, preferring to stay in the warmer water. They have between 5 and 7 pups from 7–17 eggs. They have these young in the range of 37–50 m deep to make sure the pups are warm.

Longnose or common sawshark 
The longnose sawshark aka the common sawshark (Pristiophorus  cirratus) is one of 9 species within the family Pristiophoridae. It has unique physical characteristics which include a long, thin, and flattened snout. Midway down the snout, nasal barbels protrude on both sides of the snout. Near the barbels, the longnose sawshark possesses a pair of ampullae of Lorenzini. It is unique among the sawshark family by having a longer snout than any of its counter species. The longnose sawshark is not very large with lengths ranging from around 14 inches at birth to 38 inches in males and 44 inches in females. They can also grow to a weight of 18.7 pounds. They are known to swim in the waters off the southern coast of Australia's continental shelf. They can also be found in the eastern portion of the Indian Ocean. The longnose sawshark prefers to swim in both the open sea and coastal regions from the surface to a depth of 600m. The longnose Sawshark is known to mainly prey on small crustaceans. It uses its barbels to detect prey on the ocean floor which it then hits with its snout to immobilize it. Like all other sawsharks, the common sawshark has a long snout with rows of small teeth and barbels on either side. It has five gill slits on either side of its head and between 19 and 25 teeth on each side. Sawsharks appear to be one of the types of elasmobranch that are difficult or impossible to age using most commonly-used approaches that rely on vertebral banding.

Shortnose or southern sawshark 
The shortnose sawshark aka the southern sawshark (Pristiophorus  nudipinnis) is found in south-eastern Australian waters. Much of its distribution overlaps with that of the Common sawshark, however, it seems to occur less frequently. This species is similar in size as the common sawshark, but has a broader rostrum (saw) and a more even brown coloration. It also grows to be heavier than the common sawshark. Since the color pattern of the common sawshark may be more or less defined, the easiest way to separate this species from the common sawshark is the location of the barbels, which are closer to the mouth than the co-occurring common sawshark. Unlike the common sawshark, the southern sawshark likely feeds mainly on fishes.

Tropical sawshark 
The tropical sawshark (Pristiophorus delicatus) a pale brown with a yellow hue, and an underbelly that is a pale yellow to white. This deep water dwelling fish is located off the Northeastern shore of Australia, in depths up to 176–405 m. It averages in size at about 95 cm. Other than its location and appearance little is known of the creature; it is hard to catch due to its ability to travel into the depths of the ocean.

Japanese sawshark 
The Japanese sawshark (Pristiophorus japonicus) is a species of sawshark that lives off the coast of Japan, Korea, and Northern China. It swims at a depth of 500 m. It has around 15–26 large rostral teeth in front of the barbels, which are equal distance from the gills to the snout, and about 9–17 teeth behind the barbels. Like all sawsharks, the Japanese sawshark is ovoviviparous, and feeds on crustaceans and bottom dwelling organisms.

Lana's sawshark 
Lana's sawshark (Pristiophorus lanae) is a species of sawshark that inhabits the Philippine coast. It was discovered in 1966 by Dave Ebert, who distinguished it as a new species of sawshark based on its number of rostral teeth. Lana's sawshark was named after Lana Ebert on the occasion of her graduation from the University of Francisco. It has a dark uniform brown color on the dorsal side and a pale white on the ventral side. It is slender bodied, has five gills on each side, and can grow to be around 70 cm.

African dwarf sawshark 
The African dwarf sawshark (Pristiophorus nancyae) is a small five-gill sawshark that lives off the coast of Mozambique. It was first discovered in 2011 when a specimen was caught off the coast of Mozambique at a depth of 1,600 ft. The African dwarf sawshark has since then been spotted off the coasts of Kenya and Yemen. It can be distinguished from other sawsharks by its location, and by having its barbels closer to its mouth than the end of its rostrum. It has a brownish grey color and becomes white along the ventral side. Little else is known about the African Dwarf Sawshark as it is a newly discovered species.

Shortnose sawshark 
The shortnose sawshark (Pristiophorus nudipinnis) is similar to the longnose sawshark; however, it has a slightly compressed body and shorter more narrow rostrum. It has 13 teeth in front of its barbels and 6 behind. The shortnose sawshark tends to be uniformly slate grey with no markings on its dorsal side and pale white or cream on its ventral side. Females reach around 124 cm (49 in) long, and males reach around 110 cm (43 in) long. These sharks can live to be up to 9 years old. Like other sawsharks, the Short Nose lives a benthic lifestyle and feeds on benthic invertebrates. It uses its barbels to detect life on the ocean floor which it then paralyzes with its rostrum. The species is ovoviviparous and tends to give birth to a litter of 7–14 pups biannually. It inhabits ocean floors off the coast of Australia.

Bahamas sawshark 
The Bahamas sawsharks (Pristiophorus schroeder) have very little information on them. Studies are being done daily to learn more about the deep sea dweller. They are located near Cuba, Florida, and the Bahamas (hence their name) where they dwell in the depths of 400–1000 m. As far as their appearance they can be identified by their snouts with teeth which appear as a saw, as well as their length, they are averaged at 80 cm in length.

Comparison with sawfish
Saw sharks and sawfish are cartilaginous fish possessing large saws. These are the only two fish that have a long blade-like snout. Although they are similar in appearances, saw sharks are distinct from sawfish. Sawfish are not sharks, but a type of ray. The gill slits of the sawfishes are positioned on the underside like a ray, but the gill slits of the saw shark are positioned on the side like a shark. Sawfish can have a much larger size, lack barbels, and have evenly sized teeth rather than alternating teeth of the saw shark. Clear difference is that a sawfish has no barbels and a saw shark has a prominent pair halfway along the saw. The saw shark uses these like other bottom fish, as a kind of antennae, feeling the way along the ocean bottom until it finds some prey of interest. Both the saw shark and the sawfish utilize the electroreceptors on the saw, ampullae of Lorenzini, to detect the electric field given off by buried prey.

See also

 List of sharks

References

External links
 Reefquest page
 Checklist of Living Sharks
 NOVA Online photo of longnose sawshark

 
Extant Late Jurassic first appearances

Taxa named by Pieter Bleeker

es:Pristiophorus